Sparc Systems Limited is a Malawian software company founded by Wisely Phiri in 2013 in Blantyre, Malawi. It is a multi-product and multi-division ICT company operating across Africa with 5 physical offices in Malawi, Zambia, and Rwanda.

History 
Sparc Systems was founded by Wisely Phiri to fill the gap between academic and practical knowledge, which is prevalent in Africa.

In 2016, Sparc Systems opened its first international physical office in Rwanda in form of a subsidiary.

In 2018, it expanded its business to Zambia by opening its office in Lukasa. In 2019, it opened another office in Copperbelt, Zambia.

In 2021, it developed the Student Record Academic Information System (SARIS), to be used by colleges and universities to manage student records.

In 2022, it collaborated with an NGO Caring Hands to develop the “Mental Lab” app to combat mental illnesses in Malawi.

Philanthropy 
In 2015, it took over the sponsorship for a football club called Green Hawks later named Sparc Hawks. In 2016, it donated one million Malawian kwacha to the Mayor's Trophy and pledged to support junior golf tournaments. In 2017, it donated medical equipment valued at K3.2 million to the Chatinkha Martenity wing of the Queen Elizabeth Central Hospital (QECH) in Blantyre and donated a server worth K6.5M to Chancellor College, a constituent college of the University of Malawi (UNIMA). In 2019, it donated K750,000 to the Zambia-based Living Open Foundation, which is providing technical training to Malawian youths and donated K500,000 (K6,500 Zambian kwacha) to Malawi High Commission in Lusaka, Zambia and it donated K5 million towards the annual conference that Institute of Bankers in Malawi, in partnership Oracle. In 2019, it donated K2 million to Ladies Golf Union of Malawi (LGUoM) to host the Malawi Open Strokeplay Championship.

In 2021, it sponsored two million Malawian kwacha to music artist Keturah who performed at the Diplomatic Fun Fair in Zambia. It made a donation of two million Malawian kwacha to the Information Communications Technology Association of Malawi (ICTAM) for the Information Communications Technology Expo held in September 2021 at the Bingu International Conference Center (BICC) in Lilongwe.

In 2022, it donated K1 million to Charles Thomu, a Malawian footballer who plays as a goalkeeper. In October 2022, it sponsored ICT training for 32 girls who sat for MSCE/IGSCE exams.

Awards 
In 2018, Sparc Systems received an award of the Fastest Growing Partner of the Year from NetApp for its skills and revenue achievements. In 2019, it received two awards from Information Communications Technology Association of Malawi (ICTAM) for Best Hardware & Networking and Best ICT firm. In 2021, its Mental Lab mobile app won the best innovation award at ICTAM awards.

References

External links

Companies of Malawi
Software companies